KB Tirana are an Albanian professional basketball team based in Tiranë, which is the basketball branch of SK Tirana. They compete in the Albanian Basketball League, Liga Unike and the Balkan International Basketball League. The club plays its home domestic games at the Farie Hoti Sports Palace, and they play their international games at the Asllan Rusi Sports Palace. Tirana are one of the two most successful teams in the history of Albanian basketball (men), having won the Albanian League 20 times, the Albanian Cup 19 times and the Albanian Supercups 8 times. They have won a total of 47 trophies, and only BC Partizani Tirana have won more in Albania with 48.

History

Early years (1920–43)
On 15 August 1920, shortly after Tirana became the capital city of Albania, patriot and football enthusiast Palokë Nika, who had already formed Vllaznia Shkodër built and trained a new team in Tirana, with A. Erebara, P. Jakova, A. Hoxha, Anastas Koja, P. Berisha, Avni Zajmi, H. Fortuzi, B. Pazari, L. Berisha, S. Frasheri, H. Alizoti, A. Gjitomi, and V. Fekeci. The name of the team was Gjurmuesit Republikanë, which a few months later was changed into Agimi Sports Association. The name Agimi (in English: Dawn), was taken from the building in the centre of Tirana near to where they would hold meetings. In 1925 the association's governing council was elected and its members were Avni Zajmi, Selman Stërmasi, B. Toptani, Irfan Gjinali and Anastas Koja. On 16 August 1927, which was the seventh anniversary of the formation of the Agimi Sports Association, the club's name changed into Sportklub Tirana, which would be commonly referred to as SK Tirana. On that day the president of the club was Teki Selenica. Although SK Tirana's early history was dominated by its emphasis on its football department, basketball was experiencing a rise in popularity in Albania at the time and basketball clubs across the country were being set up and friendly games were occasionally being played between clubs from different cities.

Early history and trophies (1944–72)
After the end of World War II and the liberation of Albania in 1944 Albania fell in the hands of the socialist dictator Enver Hoxha, and soon after sport in the country became organised, with national teams and domestic competitions being set up by the communist regime, and this happened with basketball in 1946. In early March 1946 at the Nacional movie theatre in Tirana, the ruling Communist Politburo had instructed the club to change its name to 17 Nëntori in honour of the Liberation of Tirana which took place on 17 November 1944 and later that year 17 Nëntori became a founding member of the Albanian Basketball League and they won the inaugural National Championship that took place in 1946. They failed to retain the title the following season as local rivals Partizani won the National Championship, but 17 Nëntori were to win 3 consecutive titles between 1948 and 1950.

Recent dominance (1999 onwards)
After 11 years drought Tirana got the right roster and coach and started winning trophies yet again. From 1999 to 2018 they won 28 such, dominating in the country.
On 30 August 2016 it was announced that Tirana would compete in the 2016–17 Balkan International Basketball League, becoming only the second Albanian club to do so after BC Vllaznia. Ahead of the 2016–17 season they appointed Macedonian Slobodan Petrovski as head coach, and signed Albanian internationals Endrit Hysenagolli, Erkand Karaj as well as foreigners Nemanja Gavranić, Griffin Ramme and Manuel Johnson. Tirana played fellow debutants KB Trepça from Kosovo on 10 October 2016 at the Asllan Rusi Sports Palace in front of around 1,100 spectators, and they won 78–66 to claim a victory in their first ever Balkan League game. 

Contrary to the domestic domination, even by approaching some quality new players and coach, KB Tirana in the Balkan League has failed to impress so far, despite 2017-18 season participation in play-off and some memorable wins. Playing, however only few seasons in this competition, team needs more experience and perhaps bringing more skillful players to seek success.

Home arenas
Tirana plays its domestic homes games at the Farie Hoti Sports Palace, which has a capacity of around 1,200. Before this arena was built they played their home games at the 2,800 seater Asllan Rusi Sports Palace, which is the main sports arena in Tirana and indeed all of Albania. As of 2016, they played their Balkan International Basketball League home games at the Asllan Rusi Sports Palace as the Farie Hoti Sports Palace does not meet the licensing requirements to stage such games.

However, in 2017 club moved to the Tirana Olympic Park, as a requirement for playing the Balkan League.

Current roster

2016–17 squad changes

In

Out

Honours 
Albanian League (20):
1946, 1948, 1949, 1950, 1957, 1961, 1962, 1963, 1965, 1971, 1999, 2001, 2002, 2008, 2009, 2010, 2011, 2012, 2017, 2018
Albanian Cup (19): 
1961, 1962, 1963, 1969, 1971, 1973, 1977, 1988, 2000, 2001, 2002, 2007, 2008, 2009, 2011, 2012, 2017, 2018, 2022  (Record)
Albanian Supercup (8): 
2001, 2003, 2008, 2009, 2010, 2011, 2012, 2017  (Record)

International competitions

Tirana in Europe

Notes
 QR: Qualifying round
 1R: First round
 2R: Second round

Tirana in the BIBL

Head coaches

Management
 Club Owners: Municipality of Tirana and SK Tirana
 Executive director: Spiro Koleka
 General manager: Angelo Koleka
 Team manager: Melzin Lazimi

KB Tirana (women)
For the women basketball team see KB Tirana (women)

References

External links 
 Eurobasket.com KB Tirana Page

Basketball teams in Albania
Sport in Tirana
Basketball teams established in 1946